Unsilent Death is the first full-length studio album by American hardcore punk band Nails, released in March 2010 by Streetcleaner Records/Six Feet Under Records.
It was later rereleased by Southern Lord Records.

Track listing

Personnel
Nails
John Gianelli - bass
Taylor Young - drums
Todd Jones - vocals, guitars

Production
Billy Benson - front cover art
Kurt Ballou - engineering, mixing
Scott Magrath - layout
Alan Douches - mastering

References 

2010 debut albums
Albums produced by Kurt Ballou
Nails (band) albums
Southern Lord Records albums